Konami Antiques MSX Collection is a series of compilations of MSX computer games released by Konami in Japan for the  PlayStation and Sega Saturn between 1997 and 1998.

Releases
Konami Antiques MSX Collection Vol. 1 — 1997 — PlayStation
Antarctic Adventure
Gradius a.k.a. Nemesis
Gofer no Yabō Episode II a.k.a. Nemesis 3
Hyper Sports 2
Konami's Boxing
Konami's Ping Pong
Mopi Ranger
Road Fighter
Sky Jaguar
Yie Ar Kung-Fu

Konami Antiques MSX Collection Vol. 2 — 1998 — PlayStation
Athletic Land
Gradius 2 a.k.a. Nemesis 2
Knightmare
Konami's Golf
Konami's Billiards
Hyper Sports 3
Magical Tree
Super Cobra
TwinBee
Yie Ar Kung-Fu II

Konami Antiques MSX Collection Vol. 3 — 1998 — PlayStation
Comic Bakery
King's Valley
Konami's Tennis
Konami's Soccer
Konami Rally
Parodius
Penguin Adventure
Pippols
Salamander
Time Pilot

Konami Antiques MSX Collection Ultra Pack — 1998 — Sega Saturn

Includes all the games in the previous releases on one disc.

References

See also
 Konami 80's Arcade Gallery - Also titled Konami Arcade Classics and Konami 80's AC Special.
 Konami Classics for Xbox 360
 Konami Classics Series: Arcade Hits - Also titled Konami Arcade Classics in Europe.
 Konami Collector's Series: Arcade Advanced
 List of Konami games

1997 video games
Japan-exclusive video games
PlayStation (console) games
PlayStation Network games
Sega Saturn games
Konami video game compilations
Video games developed in Japan